Finnish national road 11 is an east–west highway from Nokia of Pirkanmaa to Pori of Satakunta. The road is relatively short, only 101 kilometers, in addition to which the road as a whole is two-lane. Nonetheless, a highway is an important route used by industrial transportation.

The road passes through the following municipalities: Nokia - Sastamala - Kokemäki - Ulvila - Pori. Since the Sastamala and Kiikoinen joined together in 2013, this is currently the only highway in Finland that runs entirely in the territory of the municipalities using the town or city title.

The Finnish Transport Infrastructure Agency and the City of Pori plan to continue Highway 11 from their current terminus, the interchange of Highway 2, south of Pori Airport, to Highway 8, where a new interchange would be built.

Sources
 Autoilijan tiekartta 2007. AffectoGenimap Finland Oy, 2006. .

References

External links

Roads in Finland